Elisabetta Marin (born 5 November 1977) is a female javelin thrower from Italy.

Biography
Her personal best throw is 61.77 metres, achieved in June 2004 in Gorizia.

Achievements

National titles
Elisabetta Marin has won 8 times consecutively the individual national championship.
1 win in javelin throw (2004)
2 wins in javelin throw at the Italian Winter Throwing Championships (2003, 2005)

See also
 Italian all-time lists - Javelin throw

References

External links
 

1977 births
Living people
Italian female javelin throwers
Athletes (track and field) at the 2004 Summer Olympics
Olympic athletes of Italy